Savannah Elizabeth Louise Miller (born 30 December 1978) is an American-English fashion designer. After working with Alexander McQueen and Matthew Williamson, she created the label "Twenty8Twelve" with her sister, Sienna Miller. In October 2012 she launched her own collection, "Savannah".

Early life
Miller was born in Hong Kong. Her father, Edwin Miller, is an American dealer in Chinese art, previously a banker, while her mother, Josephine Miller, is a retired British model who was born in South Africa to British parents. She has a sister, Sienna, who is an actress, and two half-brothers, Charles and Stephen. Miller moved to London with her family in the 1980s. On leaving school she went to the Central Saint Martins College of Arts and Design, graduating in 2004 with a first-class honours BA degree in Fashion and Knitwear.

Career
Miller's first jobs were with Alexander McQueen and Matthew Williamson. In 2006 it was announced that Miller's sister Sienna was to design a "fashion capsule" for Pepe Jeans; this project developed into a fashion label called Twenty8Twelve, still backed by Pepe Jeans, and its first collection, designed by the two sisters, was shown in September 2007. They worked together as joint creative directors until 2012. In October of that year Miller left Twenty8Twelve and launched her own collection, "Savannah". The first Savannah line focused on "luxurious basics" and was marketed by Nelly.com. This led on to a Spring 2013 collection, reported as "heavily influenced by the 1970s". The logo of the "Savannah" line is a swallow.<ref>Sophie Warburton, "First look at Savannah Miller's new fashion line". The Daily Telegraph, 7 September 2012. Retrieved 27 August 2013</ref>

Sometimes associated with the term "boho-chic", in 2006 Miller described a "real bohemian" as "someone who has the ability to appreciate beauty on a deep level, is a profound romantic, doesn't know any limits, whose world is their own creation, rather than living in a box". However, she dislikes the word "bohemian", and the Sunday Times used the term "rural chic" for a collection she designed and modelled for the Hong Kong label Shanghai Tang.

Also an occasional model, Miller has appeared on the cover of Nylon magazine and Sunday Times Style.

Personal life
In 2005, Miller married Nick Skinner, a teacher of Bushcraft from Devon. At her home, Miller is an enthusiastic cook and gardener. In Gloucestershire, where the family arrived in 2009, she was inspired by Alys Fowler's The Edible Garden'' to plant a vegetable garden, and she also grew French and English lavender and sweet-smelling roses. She has described the garden before her arrival as "worryingly ornamental".  

In 2013 Miller and her first husband sold their house in Gloucestershire and moved their family to Panama. However, in 2015 they returned to England, after a variety of troubles, including a boating accident that happened to one of their sons. They then bought another house in the Cotswolds. They separated in 2018. 

In 2022 Miller married James Whewell, heir to the Wyresdale Park estate.

Notes

External links
Savannah Spring collection at nelly.com
Savannah Miller at vogue.co.uk

1978 births
Alumni of Central Saint Martins
American fashion designers
American women fashion designers
American voice actresses
American people of South African descent
English fashion designers
British women fashion designers
English people of American descent
English people of South African descent
Living people
Artists from New York City
Artists from London